Ledaal is a manor house which is the official residence for the King of Norway in Stavanger, Norway.

History 
The manor house was built between 1799 and 1803. It was then owned by the merchant and leading citizen in Stavanger, Gabriel Schanche Kielland (1760-1821). He gave the estate its present name after the last letters of his and his wife's names: Gabriel  Schanche Kielland, Johanna Margaretha Bull. Ledaal was bought by Stavanger Museum in 1936. The estate is today a royal residence, a museum and the representation building of Stavanger municipality.

In popular culture
In 1989 a painting of the residence was displayed at Nasjonalgalleriet as a part of the exhibition Kulturminner i norsk kunst. The painting was reviewed and commented during the opening day tour by King Olav V.

References

External links
Ledaal - Stavanger Museum web site
Ledaal - Royal House web site

Manor houses in Norway
Buildings and structures in Stavanger
Royal residences in Norway
Museums in Stavanger
Historic house museums in Norway